Secession is the act of withdrawing from an organization, union, or political entity. 

Secession may also refer to:

Political secession
 Liberal Union, also called Secession, a leftist break-away from the National Liberal Party in the German Empire
 Secession in the United States
 Killington, Vermont, secession movement, current court battle over the voted defection of a Vermont town to New Hampshire
 Missouri secession, a controversy over the double secession status of Missouri in the American Civil War era
 Ordinance of Secession, an ordinance ratified by the seceding states that was one of the causes of the American Civil War
 Secession in New York, movements to support the secession of New York City from the state or union
 Secession of Quebec (disambiguation), articles about the possible secession of Quebec from Canada
 Secessionism in Western Australia, a movement for political independence
 Urban secession, a movement for the quasi-secession of a city

Social secession
 1857 Secession, secession from the Reformed Church in America in 1857 which led to the formation of the Christian Reformed Church in North America
 Aventine Secession (disambiguation), secessions of the Aventine district in Rome
 Economic secession, a nonviolent activism technique used to fight tyranny
 First Secession, from the Church of Scotland in 1733
Secessio plebis, the original secessions of ancient Rome
Secession of 1834 or Afscheiding, secession from the Dutch Reformed Church in 1834 which led to the formation of the Christelijke Gereformeerde Kerken

Arts, entertainment, and media

Arts movements
 Secession (art), the series of secession movements in art during the late 19th and early 20th century, including:
Berlin Secession, the 1898 break from the Association of Berlin Artists 
Sonderbund westdeutscher Kunstfreunde und Künstler, the Düsseldorf secession of 1909
Vienna Secession, the 1897 secession that led to the Austrian branch of Art Nouveau
 Photo-Secession, a movement that promoted photography as a fine art

Other uses in arts, entertainment, and media
 Secession (band), a 1980s Scottish synthpop band
 Secession (magazine), a 1920s American expatriate literary magazine

Music
 Secession, a collaboration album between Starringo & Aha Gazelle
 Seccession Studios, a cinematic music label based in Los Angeles founded by Greg Dombrowski

See also
 List of active separatist movements
 List of historical separatist movements
 List of states with limited recognition
 List of U.S. state partition proposals
 List of U.S. county secession proposals
 Separatist (disambiguation)